Rustam Makhmudkulovych Khudzhamov (born 5 October 1982, in Skvyra, Ukrainian SSR, Soviet Union) is a Ukrainian retired football goalkeeper.

Club career
On 25 May 2008, Rustam signed a 5-year contract with Shakhtar Donetsk for a fee of 582,000 hryvnia (approximately 80,000 euro). His first action at the club was replacing former No.1 Andriy Pyatov as the starting goalkeeper and saving a penalty in the 5–3 penalty win over Dynamo Kyiv in the Ukrainian Super Cup final. But lost it after conceding two questionable goals versus Premier League new-boys FC Lviv, and is restricted to only cup matches.

In May 2020 he announced his retirement from a playing career due a prolonged knee injury.

International career
Rustam Khudzhamov made his debut for the Ukraine national football team in a friendly on 11 February 2009 against Serbia which Ukraine won 1–0.

Personal life
Khudzhamov is an ethnic Crimean Tatar. His name in Tatar is Rüstam Mahmüdkuli Hucamov.

Honours
Shakhtar Donetsk
 Ukrainian Cup: 2011
 Ukrainian Super Cup: 2008
 UEFA Cup: 2008–09

References

External links
Official FC Kharkiv Website Profile

1982 births
Living people
People from Skvyra
Ukrainian people of Crimean Tatar descent
Crimean Tatar sportspeople
Ukrainian footballers
Ukraine international footballers
Ukraine under-21 international footballers
Association football goalkeepers
Ukrainian Premier League players
FC Dynamo-2 Kyiv players
FC Dynamo-3 Kyiv players
FC Shakhtar Donetsk players
FC Kharkiv players
FC Hoverla Uzhhorod players
FC Metalurh Donetsk players
FC Mariupol players
FC Zorya Luhansk players
FC Metalist Kharkiv players
Sportspeople from Kyiv Oblast